Eden District Council in Cumbria, England is elected every four years.

Political control
Since the foundation of the council in 1973 political control of the council has been held by the following parties:

Leadership
In 2002, following the Local Government Act 2000, the council adopted the "alternative arrangements" style of governance, as was permitted for authorities with under 85,000 residents. Eden's alternative arrangements were said to be unique within England for not having a single nominated leader, but instead having a group of four joint leaders, each of whom chaired one of the council's four main committees. The arrangement lasted for six years. In 2008, the council changed to a leader and cabinet model instead, with a single leader. The leaders of the council since 2002 have been:

Council elections
1973 Eden District Council election
1976 Eden District Council election
1979 Eden District Council election (New ward boundaries)
1983 Eden District Council election
1987 Eden District Council election
1991 Eden District Council election (District boundary changes took place but the number of seats remained the same)
1995 Eden District Council election
1999 Eden District Council election (New ward boundaries increased the number of seats by 1)
2003 Eden District Council election
2007 Eden District Council election
2011 Eden District Council election
2015 Eden District Council election
2019 Eden District Council election

By-election results

1999-2003

2003-2007

2007-2011

2015-2019

The by-election was triggered by the resignation of Councillor David Hymers.

The by-election was triggered by the resignation of Councillor Thomas Sheriff.

2019-2023

References

By-election results

External links
 Eden Council

 
Council elections in Cumbria
Eden District
District council elections in England